Leader (an acronym for Miflaga Mitkademet Liberalit Demokratit, lit. Progressive Liberal Democratic Party) was a minor political party in Israel. Headed by Alexander Radko, it is related to the Liberal Democratic Party of Russia.

It has run in elections in 2003, 2006, 2009 and 2013. In 2003 it won only 833 votes, the lowest of any party. In 2006 it received 580 votes, again the lowest. In 2009, it received 1,887 votes, and in 2013—1,568 votes—not succeeding in passing the electoral threshold and not receiving any seats.

References

Defunct political parties in Israel
Parties affiliated with the Liberal Democratic Party of Russia
Russian-Jewish culture in Israel